Charles-Philippe Larivière (28 September 1798 in Paris – 29 February 1876 in Paris) was a French academic painter and lithographer.

Biography 
A talented student of Paulin Guérin, Girodet-Trioson and Antoine-Jean Gros, he was admitted to the école des Beaux-Arts in 1813 and won second prize in the Prix de Rome in 1819 then a médaille d'encouragement in 1820. In 1824, he won first prize in the Prix de Rome with a painting of The Death of Alcibiades, thus allowing him to stay in Rome at the Villa Medici from 1824 to 1830.

Receptive to the sensibilities of the Romantic school but formed within the discipline of classicism, he became an official artist specialising in history paintings of public events and battles of the Ancien Régime (such as the Battle of the Dunes) and the medieval period (such as Montgisard and Castillon), though he also produced portraits of public figures and religious works. He first exhibited at the Paris Salon in 1827 and won a medal in 1831 and 1855. He benefitted from important public commissions (such as 3 of the paintings in the Galerie des batailles at the château de Versailles) and received the Légion d'honneur in 1836. He was also awarded the Tunisian Nichan Iftikhar.

Among the portraits of historic figures which he assigned to the paintings collection at the Musée d'Histoire de France at Versailles are those of marshals Rochambeau, Bugeaud and Saint-Arnaud. His standing portrait of général Dode de La Brunerie hung on the escalier d'honneur of the Pavillon du Roi, at the Château de Vincennes.

He also decorated a chapel dedicated to Saint-Eustache and, like Ingres, produced cartoons for stained glass windows for the Chapelle royale de Dreux. On his death his family left what was left in his studio to the musée de Picardie. The last painting by Larivière to enter a French public collection was Le Tasse convalescent au couvent de Saint-Onufre, acquired in 2001 by the Museum of Grenoble.

Family
Charles-Philippe Larivière was the grandson of the painter Charles Lepeintre and uncle by marriage to the painter Albert Maignan.

His brother Louis-Eugène Larivière (c1801-1823) was also a painter. Albert Maignan left the Louvre a portrait by Louis-Eugene of Eugénie-Paméla Larivière (c 1804–1824), sister to Charles-Philippe and Louis-Eugène.

Gallery

Versailles

References  

Isabelle Loddé : Charles-Philippe Larivière, peintre : sa vie, son œuvre (1798–1876), thesis submitted to the université de Paris IV-Sorbonne on 18 November 2005, under the supervision of Bruno Foucart.
Gustave Vapereau : Dictionnaire universel des contemporains (Paris, 1880).

1798 births
1876 deaths
19th-century French painters
French male painters
École des Beaux-Arts alumni
Pupils of Antoine-Jean Gros
Recipients of the Legion of Honour
Prix de Rome for painting
19th-century painters of historical subjects
19th-century French male artists